Redtye is a hamlet in mid Cornwall, England. Redtye is southwest of Lanivet on the A30 main road.

References

Hamlets in Cornwall